The United States Navy Medical Service Corps is a staff corps of the U.S. Navy, consisting of officers engaged in medical support duties. It includes healthcare scientists and researchers, comprising around 60% of its personnel, and healthcare administrators, comprising the remaining 40%. Many of the latter are former enlisted hospital corpsmen, the Medical Service Corps Inservice Procurement Program (MSC-IPP) being one of several routes from enlisted service to commissioned status. The Medical Service Corps has around 2,600 serving commissioned officers.

Prior Chiefs / Directors

Organization 
The Navy Medical Service Corps was created on 4 August 1947 by act of the United States Congress. Originally it had four specialist sections: Supply and Administration, Optometry, Allied Sciences, and Pharmacy. Currently the Navy Medical Service Corps has three sections: Healthcare Administration, Healthcare Sciences, and Clinical Care Providers.

Healthcare Sciences are subdivided into the following fields of specialty:
 Aerospace Experimental Psychology
 Aerospace Physiology
 Biochemistry
 Entomology
 Environmental Health
 Industrial Hygiene
 Medical Technology
 Microbiology
 Research Physiology
 Radiation Health
 Research Psychology

Clinical Care Providers are subdivided into the following fields of specialty:
 Audiology
 Clinical Psychology
 Dietitian/Food Management
 Occupational Therapy
 Optometry
 Pharmacy
 Physical Therapy
 Physician Assistant
 Podiatry
 Social Work

See also
Medical Service Corps (U.S. Army)
Medical Specialist Corps (U.S. Army)
Biomedical Sciences Corps (U.S. Air Force)
Medical Service Corps (U.S. Air Force)

References

External links
Naval Medical Research Center official webpage (on USN official website)
Medical Service Corps. Navy.com (Health Care Opportunities)

Medical Service
Military units and formations established in 1947
United States Navy Medical Service Corps